Molly Skudowitz is a former Israeli international lawn bowler.

Bowls career
Skudowitz won a bronze medal in the fours with Edith Silverman, Helen Gordon, Rina Lebel and Bernice Pillemer at the 1981 World Outdoor Bowls Championship in Toronto.

Personal life
She was married to fellow international bowler Sam Skudowitz.

References

Israeli female bowls players
Living people
Year of birth missing (living people)